Page boy or pageboy may refer to:

Page (servant), a young male servant, especially in medieval times.
Page boy (wedding attendant) (also ringbearer or coinbearer), a young male attendant at a wedding.
Pageboy, a hairstyle.
Motorola Pageboy, the second pager ever produced by Motorola with individual-unit addressing.
Motorola Pageboy II.